Barfi Kushkarri (also Romanized as Barfī Kūshkarrī; also known as Barfī Gūshkarrī, Jegarlū Gūsh Kanīsh, and Jegarlū Gūsh Karīz) is a village in Fathabad Rural District, in the Central District of Qasr-e Shirin County, Kermanshah Province, Iran. At the 2006 census, its population was 232, in 52 families.

References 

Populated places in Qasr-e Shirin County